Palestrina Glacier is a glacier lying in the northern portion of Alexander Island, Antarctica, 11 nautical miles (20 km) long and 8 nautical miles (15 km) wide, flowing west from Nichols Snowfield into Lazarev Bay. The glacier was mapped from air photos taken by the Ronne Antarctic Research Expedition (RARE), 1947–48, by Derek J.H. Searle of the Falkland Islands Dependencies Survey (FIDS) in 1960. Named by the United Kingdom Antarctic Place-Names Committee (UK-APC) for Giovanni da Palestrina (1525–1594), Italian composer.

See also
 List of glaciers in the Antarctic
 Balakirev Glacier
 Lennon Glacier
 Moran Glacier

Glaciers of Alexander Island